Boana freicanecae is a species of frog in the family Hylidae and is endemic to Brazil. Its natural habitats are subtropical or tropical moist lowland forests and rivers.

Sources

Boana
Endemic fauna of Brazil
Amphibians described in 2004
Taxonomy articles created by Polbot